The year 618 BC was a year of the pre-Julian Roman calendar. In the Roman Empire, it was known as year 136 Ab urbe condita . The denomination 618 BC for this year has been used since the early medieval period, when the Anno Domini calendar era became the prevalent method in Europe for naming years.

Events
 King Qing of Zhou succeeds his father King Xiang of Zhou as ruler of the Chinese Zhou Dynasty.

Births

Deaths
 Duke Gong of Cao, ruler of the state of Cao

References